Celtic diaspora may refer to any of the following diasporas of Celtic people:
 Cornish diaspora
 Irish diaspora
 Scottish diaspora
Welsh people § Welsh diaspora